This page documents the tornadoes and tornado outbreaks of 1988, primarily in the United States. Most tornadoes form in the U.S., although some events may take place internationally. Tornado statistics for older years like this often appear significantly lower than modern years due to fewer reports or confirmed tornadoes.

Synopsis

1988 was one of the least active tornado seasons on record.  March and April saw unusually low activity, as did June.  There were some notable outbreaks later in the year, including the Raleigh tornado which was probably the most publicized tornado event of the year.

Events
Confirmed tornado total for the entire year 1988 in the United States.

January
There were 17 tornadoes confirmed in the US in January.

January 19
A deadly outbreak spawned 14 tornadoes. Three separate tornadoes, rated F2/F3, killed five people in Tennessee, one of which killed 3 and injured 24 in Williston. An F4 tornado also struck Attala County, Mississippi, but resulted in no fatalities.

February
There were 4 tornadoes confirmed in the US in February.

March
There were 28 tornadoes confirmed in the US in March.

April
There were 58 tornadoes confirmed in the US in April.

April 19
An F3 tornado killed four people and injured 15 others in Madison, Florida.

May
There were 132 tornadoes confirmed in the US in May.

May 8
A large outbreak saw 57 tornadoes, mainly in Iowa, Illinois and Wisconsin (two rated as high as F3 in Darlington, Wisconsin and Eldridge, Iowa). There were no fatalities.

June
There were 63 tornadoes confirmed in the US in June.

June 7
An F1 tornado in Smyrna, Delaware caused no fatalities, but at least 30 injuries, with damage estimated between 500,000 and 5 million dollars.

June 15
An F3 tornado struck 4.4 miles south of downtown Denver, Colorado.

July
There were 103 tornadoes confirmed in the US in July.

July 5
A tornado outbreak saw three F3 tornadoes in and around Fort Benton, Montana. There were no reported fatalities.

August
There were 61 tornadoes confirmed in the US in August.

September
There were 76 tornadoes confirmed in the US in September.

October
There were 19 tornadoes confirmed in the US in October.

November
There were 121 tornadoes confirmed in the US in November.

November 15
A tornado outbreak spawned 44 tornadoes, including three F3 tornadoes. Seven people were killed, five of which came from F2 tornado in Arkansas.

November 28

The 1988 F4 Raleigh tornado killed four people and was part of a series of moderate outbreaks that month.

December
There were 20 tornadoes confirmed in the US in December.

December 24
An F4 tornado killed one person in Franklin, Tennessee.

See also
 Tornado
 Tornadoes by year
 Tornado records
 Tornado climatology
 Tornado myths
 List of tornado outbreaks
 List of F5 and EF5 tornadoes
 List of North American tornadoes and tornado outbreaks
 List of 21st-century Canadian tornadoes and tornado outbreaks
 List of European tornadoes and tornado outbreaks
 List of tornadoes and tornado outbreaks in Asia
 List of Southern Hemisphere tornadoes and tornado outbreaks
 List of tornadoes striking downtown areas
 Tornado intensity
 Fujita scale
 Enhanced Fujita scale

References

External links
 U.S. tornadoes in 1988 - Tornado History Project
 Tornado deaths monthly

 
1988 meteorology
Tornado-related lists by year
Torn